Vice Admiral John Brett Purvis (12 August 1787 – 1 October 1857) was a Royal Navy officer who became Commander-in-Chief, South East Coast of America Station.

Naval career
Born the son of Admiral John Child Purvis, Purvis joined the Royal Navy in 1799. Promoted to commodore, he became Commander-in-Chief, South East Coast of America Station in March 1842. Promoted to rear admiral on 9 November 1846, he went on to be Commander-in-Chief, Queenstown in June 1852 and was promoted to vice admiral on 4 July 1853.

References

|-

1787 births
1857 deaths
Royal Navy vice admirals